Tianhe Park station, is a station of Line 21 of the Guangzhou Metro. It started operations on 20 December 2019. With the opening of Line 11 in 2023, line 21 will be truncated to here from Yuancun, as to allow line 11 trains to serve that station instead. It will also be an interchange station with Line 13 in 2023.

Station Layout
When fully complete in 2023, the station's total construction area of the station will be 78558 square meters, which is equivalent to 2.3 Gongyuanqian stations and 3.3 Yangji stations. It will also be the largest station on the whole of Guangzhou Metro.

The station has 2 underground island platforms. Platform 1 is for trains heading to Zengcheng Square, whilst platform 2 is for trains heading to Yuancun. Platforms 3 and 4 are currently not in use, however, they will be put into service when line 11 opens, serving line 21 instead. On the other hand, platforms 1 and 2 will serve line 11.

Exits
There are 3 exits, lettered B, E1 and F. Exits B and E1 are accessible. Exit B is located on Middle Huangpu Avenue, whilst exits E1 and F are located on Tianfu Road.

Gallery

References

Railway stations in China opened in 2019
Guangzhou Metro stations in Tianhe District